1000 Piazzia, provisional designation , is a carbonaceous background asteroid from the outer region of the asteroid belt, approximately  in diameter. It was discovered on 12 August 1923, by German astronomer Karl Reinmuth at Heidelberg Observatory in southern Germany. The C-type asteroid has a rotation period of 9.5 hours. It was named after Italian Giuseppe Piazzi, who discovered 1 Ceres.

Orbit and classification 

Piazzia is a non-family asteroid from the main belt's background population. It orbits the Sun in the outer asteroid belt at a distance of 2.4–4.0 AU once every 5 years and 8 months (2,063 days; semi-major axis of 3.17 AU). Its orbit has an eccentricity of 0.26 and an inclination of 21° with respect to the ecliptic. As no precoveries were taken, the body's observation arc begins with its first recorded observation on the night following its official discovery date.

Naming 

This minor planet was named in honour of Italian Theatine monk Giuseppe Piazzi (1746–1826). He was a director of both the Palermo and Naples observatories, and known for the compilation of the Palermo Catalogue, containing the precise position of 7,646 stars. In 1801, Piazzi discovered 1 Ceres, the first and largest asteroid and the main-belt's only dwarf planet. He is also honored by the lunar crater Piazzi. The official naming citation was first mentioned in The Names of the Minor Planets by Paul Herget in 1955. The asteroid is the first of several early "kilo-numbered" minor planets that were dedicated to renowned scientists or institutions including:
 2000 Herschel, for William Herschel who discovered Uranus
 3000 Leonardo, for the Italian polymath of the Renaissance, Leonardo da Vinci
 4000 Hipparchus, for the ancient Greek astronomer Hipparchus

1000 Piazzia was named as part of trio honoring the events surrounding the discovery of Ceres in 1801. A person named Carl Friedrich Gauss who computed the orbit of Ceres, and Heinrich Wilhelm Matthias Olbers who found it again later that year after it has passed behind the Sun. In honor of them, 1001 Gaussia for Gauss and 1002 Olbersia for Olbers were named along with 1000 Piazzia. In the next few years only three more astronomical bodies were found between Mars and Jupiter, Pallas, Juno, and 4 Vesta, however it would be 37 years before another asteroid was found, 5 Astraea in 1845.

By 1868, 100 asteroids had been discovered, however it would not be until 1921 that the 1000th was discovered. The rate accelerated in the 20th century and the ten thousandth would be discovered in 1989.

Physical characteristics 

In the Tholen- and SMASS-like taxonomy of the Small Solar System Objects Spectroscopic Survey (S3OS2), Piazzia is a carbonaceous C-type and Cb-subtype, respectively, latter which transitions to the somewhat "brighter" B-type asteroids.

Rotation period 

After Piazzia had been published by The Minor Planet Bulletin as an opportunity for photometry in 2001, a classically shaped bimodal lightcurve was obtained by Robert Stephens at the Santana Observatory  in Rancho Cucamonga, California. The lightcurve gave a rotation period of  hours with a brightness variation of 0.45 magnitude. A second lightcurve was obtained by astronomer René Roy in March 2007, rendering a period of  hours and an amplitude of 0.2 magnitude.

Diameter and albedo 

The Collaborative Asteroid Lightcurve Link derives a low albedo of 0.05 and a diameter of 47.19 kilometers based on an absolute magnitude of 10.5. According to the space-based surveys carried out by the Infrared Astronomical Satellite IRAS, the Japanese Akari satellite and the NEOWISE mission of NASA's Wide-field Infrared Survey Explorer, Piazzia measures between 45.72 and 51.55 kilometers in diameter and its surface has an albedo between 0.041 and 0.1119.

See also 
 List of minor planets: 1–1000
 List of minor planets: 1001–2000
 100000 Astronautica (the 100,000th numbered minor planet)

References

External links 
 Asteroid Lightcurve Database (LCDB), query form (info )
 Dictionary of Minor Planet Names, Google books
 Asteroids and comets rotation curves, CdR – Observatoire de Genève, Raoul Behrend
 Discovery Circumstances: Numbered Minor Planets (1)-(5000) – Minor Planet Center
 
 

001000
Discoveries by Karl Wilhelm Reinmuth
Named minor planets
19230812